Bulow Creek State Park is a Florida State Park located five miles (8 km) north of Ormond Beach. It is on Old Dixie Highway (CR 4011), next to the Atlantic Ocean. The park is adjacent to Bulow Plantation Ruins Historic State Park, and close to North Peninsula State Park, Gamble Rogers Memorial State Recreation Area and Tomoka State Park.

Ecology

Flora
Containing one of the largest stands of southern live oak remaining on the east coast of Florida, the park's "star" is the Fairchild Oak. Over four centuries old, it is among the largest of its kind in the southern United States.

Fauna
Among the wildlife of the park are white-tailed deer, barred owls and raccoons.

Recreational activities
Activities include hiking, canoeing, picnicing, wildlife viewing and primitive camping. Amenities include nature trails, a picnic pavilion and a primitive campsite. The Bulow Woods Trail, more than six miles (10 km) long, leads to Bulow Plantation Ruins Historic State Park.

Hours
Florida state parks are open between 8 a.m. and sundown every day of the year (including holidays).

Gallery

References

 Bulow Creek State Park at Florida State Parks
 Bulow Creek State Park at Absolutely Florida

State parks of Florida
Parks in Volusia County, Florida
Protected areas established in 1981
Ormond Beach, Florida
1981 establishments in Florida